The MO (Malyj Okhotnik; , nickname Moshka (Midge) is a class of small ships produced before and during World War II for the Soviet Navy. Their primary function originally was anti-submarine warfare. During the war they carried out many additional roles from supporting landing operations to escorting convoys. Over 350 ships were built.

Background

In early 1930s, the main focus of Soviet shipbuilding was building small patrol ships and boats with various duties. Among them, a large part consisted of submarine hunter boats. The MO class was the first Soviet built submarine hunter ship class, with the abbreviation meaning "Small Hunter". Unlike torpedo boats, MO boats had no torpedo weapons, but instead had depth charge launchers.

Design history

MO-1, MO-2 and MO-3 types

The first ship of the class was a  border patrol boat PK-139, which was given the class designation of MO-1 in 1935. The production series was a slightly faster ship, given the designation MO-2. Some 27–36 ships of this class were built in 1935–1936. A slightly modified MO-3 was in limited production resulting in four ships built.

MO-4 type

MO-4 was the most produced type of the class, with approximately 250 built. It was a slightly modified MO-2 variant, with a more vertical stern and slightly lower. It was designed at the NKVD "No. 5 construction bureau" in Leningrad. The ship had no armor and had a wooden structure, but consisted of nine sections isolated from each other, allowed to stay afloat even after suffering heavy damage. The main weapons of the ship were the depth charges and 45 mm semi-automatic guns. The ships also had a pair of DShK machine guns. MO-4 ships were built at several shipyards including Leningrad, Murmansk and Astrakhan from 1937 to 1943.

BMO type

In summer 1943, the Leningrad shipyards designed a new variant to remedy the MO-4's lack of armor. The letter "B" stood for "бронированный". The new ship was made of steel, with armor of up to  protecting the engine. One of the 45mm guns was replaced with a 37mm 70K anti-aircraft gun, which had higher performance in the anti aircraft role. 48 were built during the war and another 18 in the second half of 1945.

Service history

MO class ships carried out a very large number of duties during the war, serving in all fleets. Their duties included patrolling naval bases perimeter, hunting submarines, escorting convoys, laying and disarming mines, supporting amphibious landings and fighting small enemy ships. Some distinguished individual ships are listed below.

MO-103

This is one of the most famous MO ships. On July 30, 1944 she sank the German submarine U-250 in shallow waters of the Baltic Sea. The commander of U-250 and five crewmen survived and were captured. The submarine was raised by Soviet forces in early September and moved to Leningrad. To the delight of the engineers, the submarine had intact secret acoustic torpedoes on board.

MO-144

Earlier named "MO-113". Sank the German submarine U-679 on January 9, 1945 in the Baltic Sea.

MO-65
Earlier known PK-125, SKA-124 and SKA-65. Served in the Black Sea Fleet. For generally outstanding performance was named a "guards ship" on July 25, 1943. Survived until the end of the war.

SKA-84

Served in the Black Sea Fleet. During the war, the ship destroyed two enemy patrol boats and one aircraft. The ship also escorted a total of 184 ships on convoying missions and removed 20 sea mines during mine sweeping missions. SKA-84 was the first ship in the Soviet Navy to have the naval  Katiusha variant installed. Sunk by artillery fire on September 11, 1943 near Novorossiysk.

Footnotes

References

External links

Submarine chaser classes
Ships of the Soviet Navy